Fritzi Jane Courtney (February 15, 1923 – August 7, 2012) was an American actress.

The only daughter of Joseph and Rose Jassem, she was born in New York City and was raised in Brooklyn. She graduated from Brooklyn College. While attending drama school, she was employed by a tie company in New York City.

She met her future husband, Robert  Cohen at a USO during World War II. In 1946, the couple moved to Maine. They were the parents of one daughter, Jill S. Cohen.

While working for NBC affiliate, Channel 6, Fritzi became the first woman on-air drama critic in New England, reviewing theatrical productions.

She is best known for playing Mrs. Taft, the hotel owner, in three Jaws films. She played Mrs. Taft in Jaws (1975), then reprised her role in two sequels – Jaws 2 (1978) starring alongside Joseph Mascolo, and again in Jaws: The Revenge (1987).

On August 7, 2012, Fritzi died at her residence in Portland, Maine.

Filmography
 Route 66 (1963, TV Series) as Librarian (uncredited)
 Jaws (1975) as Mrs. Taft (uncredited)
 Jaws 2 (1978) as Mrs. Taft
 Spraggue (1984, TV Movie) as Judge
 Jaws: The Revenge (1987) as Mrs. Taft

References

External links
 
 

1923 births
2012 deaths
20th-century American actresses
American film actresses
American television actresses
American stage actresses
Actresses from New York (state)
Actresses from Portland, Maine
Brooklyn College alumni
21st-century American women